Devosia mishustinii is a bacterium from the genus of Devosia.

References

Hyphomicrobiales
Bacteria described in 2009